The 1902 eruption of Mount Pelée was a volcanic eruption on the island of Martinique in the Lesser Antilles Volcanic Arc of the eastern Caribbean, which was one of the deadliest eruptions in recorded history. Eruptive activity began on 23 April as a series of phreatic explosions from the summit of Mount Pelée. Within days, the vigor of the explosions exceeded anything witnessed since the island was settled by Europeans. The intensity then subsided for a few days until early May, when the explosions increased again. Lightning laced the eruption clouds and trade winds dumped ash on villages to the west. Heavy ash fell, sometimes causing total darkness. Saint-Pierre received its first ash fall on 3 May.

Mount Pelée remained relatively quiet until the afternoon of 5 May when a mudflow swept down a river on the southwest flank of the volcano, destroying a sugar mill. The massive flow buried about 150 people and generated a series of three tsunamis as it hit the sea. The tsunamis swept along the coast, damaging buildings and boats. The explosions resumed the night of 5 May. The following morning, parts of the eruption plume became incandescent, signifying that the character of the eruption had changed. The phreatic explosions had finally given way to magmatic explosions as magma reached the surface. The explosions continued through the next day and night.

A brief lull was shattered by a tremendous explosion at about 8:00 a.m. on 8 May. A ground-hugging cloud of incandescent lava particles suspended by searing turbulent gases moved at hurricane speed down the southwest flank of the volcano, reaching Saint-Pierre at 8:02 a.m. Escape from the city was virtually impossible. Almost everyone within the city proper—about 28,000 people—died, burned or buried by falling masonry. The hot ash ignited a firestorm, fueled by smashed buildings and countless casks of rum. Only two people survived within the city, one of them a clueless prisoner who was locked in a windowless underground jail cell, later being discovered by rescue workers. The only other survivors were a few tens of people caught within the margins of the cloud, all who were badly burned.

Explosive activity on 20 May resulted in another 2,000 deaths as rescuers, engineers and mariners brought supplies to the island. A powerful eruption on 30 August generated a pyroclastic flow that resulted in over 800 people killed. The eruption continued until October 1905.

Before the eruption
Before the 1902 eruption, as early as the mid-19th century, signs of increased fumarole activity were present in the Étang Sec (Dry Pond) crater near the summit. Relatively minor phreatic eruptions that occurred in 1792 and 1851 were evidence that the volcano was active and potentially dangerous. The indigenous Carib people were aware of the mountain's volcanic activity from previous eruptions in ancient times.

Eruptions began on 23 April 1902. In early April, excursionists noted the appearance of sulfurous vapors emitting from fumaroles near the mountaintop. This was not regarded as important, as fumaroles had appeared and disappeared in the past. On 23 April there was a light rain of cinders on the mountain's southern and western side, together with seismic activity. On 25 April the mountain emitted a large cloud containing rocks and ashes from its top, where the Étang Sec caldera was located. The ejected material did not cause a significant amount of damage. On 26 April the surroundings were dusted by volcanic ash from an explosion; the public authorities still did not see any cause for concern.

Sounds resembling a cauldron with boiling water were heard from deep underground. On 30 April Rivière des Pères and the river Roxelane swelled, carrying boulders and trees from the mountaintop. The villages of Prêcheur and Sainte-Philomène received a steady stream of ash.

At 11:30 p.m. on 2 May, the mountain produced loud explosions, earthquakes and a massive pillar of dense black smoke. Ashes and fine-grained pumice covered the entire northern half of the island. The explosions continued at 5–6 hour intervals. This led the local newspaper Les Colonies to indefinitely postpone a proposed picnic on the mountain, originally planned for 4 May. Farm animals started dying from hunger and thirst, as their sources of water and food were contaminated with ash.

On Saturday 3 May, the wind blew the ash cloud northwards, alleviating the situation in Saint-Pierre. The next day the ash fall intensified, and the communication between Saint-Pierre and the Prêcheur district was severed. The ash cloud was so dense that the coastal boats feared navigating through it. Many citizens decided to flee the city, filling the steamer lines to capacity. The area was covered with a layer of fine, flour-like white ash.

Refugees from other areas rushed into Saint-Pierre. That night, the atmospheric disturbances disabled the electric grid, sank the city into darkness and added to the confusion.

The next day at about 02:00, loud sounds were heard from within the depths of the mountain. On Wednesday 7 May at around 04:00, activity increased; the clouds of ash caused numerous bolts of volcanic lightning around the mountaintop, and both craters glowed reddish orange into the night. Through the day, people were leaving the city, but more people from the countryside were attempting to find refuge in the city, increasing its population by several thousand. The newspapers still claimed the city was safe. News of the Soufrière volcano erupting on the nearby island of Saint Vincent reassured the people, who believed it was a sign that Mount Pelée's internal pressure was being relieved. However, Captain Marina Leboffe, of the barque Orsolina, left the harbor with only half of his sugar cargo loaded, despite shippers' protests, clearance being refused by port authorities, and under threat of arrest. Many other civilians were refused permission to leave town. Governor Louis Mouttet and his wife stayed in the city. By the evening, Mount Pelée's tremors seemed to calm down again.

Climactic phase

On Thursday morning 8 May, the night shift telegraph operator was sending the reports of the volcano's activity to the operator at Fort-de-France, claiming no significant new developments; his last transmission at 07:52 was "Allez", handing over the line to the remote operator. In the next second, the telegraph line went dead. The upper mountainside ripped open and a dense black cloud shot out horizontally. A second black cloud rolled upwards, forming a gigantic mushroom cloud and darkening the sky in a  radius. The horizontal pyroclastic surge hugged the ground and sped down towards the city of Saint-Pierre, appearing black and heavy, glowing hot from within. It consisted of superheated steam and volcanic gases and dust, with temperatures exceeding . In under a minute it reached and covered the entire city, instantly igniting everything combustible. The cable repair ship, CS Grappler, floating offshore, was set on fire and sunk by the surge, with the loss of all hands.

A rush of wind followed, this time towards the mountain. Then came a half-hour downpour of muddy rain mixed with ashes. For the next several hours, all communication with the city was severed. Nobody knew what was happening, nor who had authority over the island, as the governor was unreachable and his status unknown.

There are unnamed eyewitnesses to the eruption, probably survivors on the boats at the time of the eruption. One eyewitness said "the mountain was blown to pieces - there was no warning," while another said "it was like a giant oil refinery." One said "the town vanished before our eyes."

At the time of the eruption, Saint-Pierre had a population of about 28,000, which had swollen with refugees from the minor explosions and mud flows first emitted by the volcano. Legend has previously reported that out of the 30,000 in the city, there were only two survivors: Louis-Auguste Cyparis, a felon held in an underground cell in the town's jail for wounding a friend with a cutlass, and Léon Compère-Léandre, a man who lived at the edge of the city. In reality, there were a number of survivors who made their way out of the fringes of the blast zone. Many of these survivors were badly burned, and some died later from their injuries. A number made their way to Le Carbet, just south of Saint-Pierre behind a ridge that protected that town from the worst of the pyroclastic flow; survivors were rescued on the beach there by Martinique officials.

Compère-Léandre stated the following when asked about his survival:
I felt a terrible wind blowing, the earth began to tremble, and the sky suddenly became dark. I turned to go into the house, with great difficulty climbed the three or four steps that separated me from my room, and felt my arms and legs burning, also my body. I dropped upon a table. At this moment four others sought refuge in my room, crying and writhing with pain, although their garments showed no sign of having been touched by flame. At the end of 10 minutes one of these, the young Delavaud girl, aged about 10 years, fell dead; the others left. I got up and went to another room, where I found the father Delavaud, still clothed and lying on the bed, dead. He was purple and inflated, but the clothing was intact. Crazed and almost overcome, I threw myself on a bed, inert and awaiting death. My senses returned to me in perhaps an hour, when I beheld the roof burning. With sufficient strength left, my legs bleeding and covered with burns, I ran to Fonds-Saint-Denis, six kilometers from Saint-Pierre.

One woman, a housemaid, also survived the pyroclastic flow but died soon after. She said that the only thing she remembered from the event was sudden heat. She died very shortly after being discovered. A third reported survivor was Havivra Da Ifrile, a 10-year-old girl who had rowed to shelter in a cave. Included among the victims were the passengers and crews of several ships docked at Saint-Pierre.

One passenger steamship, the Roraima, which went missing on 26 April, was believed to have been engulfed by ash from a preliminary explosion. However, it reached the port of Saint-Pierre at 06:30, shortly before the eruption, and was set aflame by the pyroclastic flow. It later sank; its wreck is still present offshore of Saint-Pierre. Twenty-eight of her crew, and all the passengers except two (a child and her creole nurse), were killed by the cloud.

Relief
At about 12:00, the acting governor of Martinique sent the cruiser  to investigate what had happened and the warship arrived off the burning town at about 12:30. The fierce heat beat back landing parties until nearly 15:00, when the captain came ashore on the Place Bertin, the tree-shaded square with cafés near the center of town. Not a tree was standing; the denuded trunks, scorched and bare, lay prone, torn out by the roots. The ground was littered with dead. Fire and a suffocating stench prevented any deeper exploration of the burning ruins.

Meanwhile, a number of survivors had been plucked from the sea by small boats; they were sailors who had been blown into the water by the impact of the blast, and who had clung to wreckage for hours. All were badly burned. In the village of Le Carbet, shielded from the fiery cloud by a high promontory at the southern end of the city, were more victims, also badly burned; few of these lived longer than a few hours.

Inside this area, the annihilation of life and property was total; outside was a second, clearly defined zone where there were casualties, but the material damage was less, while beyond this lay a strip in which vegetation was scorched but life was spared. Many victims were in casual attitudes, their features calm and reposeful, indicating that the eruption blast had reached them without warning; others were contorted in anguish. The clothing had been torn from nearly all the victims struck down outdoors. Some houses were almost pulverized; it was impossible even for those familiar with the city to identify the foundations of the city landmarks. The city burned for days. Sanitation parties gradually penetrated the ruins, to dispose of the dead by burning; burial was not possible given the number of dead. Thousands of victims lay under a shroud of ashes, heaped in windrows metres deep, caked by the rains; many of these bodies were not retrieved for weeks, and few were identifiable.

The United States quickly offered help to Martinique's authorities. On 12 May, US president Theodore Roosevelt instructed the Secretaries of War, Navy, and Treasury to start relief measures at once. Multiple U.S. ships were dispatched to the island with haste, namely the cruiser Cincinnati, lying at Santo Domingo; the Dixie, a converted freighter which carried Army rations, medical supplies and doctors; and the Navy tug Potomac at San Juan, Puerto Rico. President Roosevelt asked Congress for an immediate appropriation of $500,000 for emergency assistance to the victims of the calamity. The President said: "One of the greatest calamities in history has befallen our neighboring island of Martinique ... The city of St. Pierre has ceased to exist ... The government of France ... informs us that Fort-de-France and the entire island of Martinique are still threatened. They therefore request that, for the purpose of rescuing the people who are in such deadly peril and threatened with starvation, the government of the United States may send as soon as possible the means of transporting them from the stricken island." The US Congress voted for $200,000 of immediate assistance and set hearings to determine what larger sum might be needed when the full nature of the disaster could be learned. In an appeal for public funds the President empowered postmasters to receive donations for relief of the victims; a national committee of prominent citizens took charge of chartering supply ships.

Canada, the UK, Germany, France, Italy, Denmark, Japan, Russia and the Vatican also offered help.

Subsequent activity

On May 20, a second eruption similar to the first one in both type and force obliterated what was left of Saint-Pierre, killing 2,000 rescuers, engineers, and mariners bringing supplies to the island. During a powerful eruption on 30 August , a pyroclastic flow extended further east than the flows of 8 and 20 May. Although not quite as powerful as the previous two eruptions, the 30 August pyroclastic flow struck Morne Rouge, killing at least 800, Ajoupa-Bouillon  (250 fatalities), and parts of Basse-Pointe (25 fatalities) and Morne-Capot, killing 10. A tsunami caused some damage in Le Carbet. To date, this was the last fatal eruption of Mount Pelée.

Called the "Needle of Pelée" or "Pelée's Tower", it grew in height by up to  a day, with more or less the same volume as the Great Pyramid of Egypt. It became unstable and collapsed into a pile of rubble in March 1903, after 5 months of growth. The eruption eventually ended on 5 October 1905.

Effects
The study of the causes of the disaster marked the beginning of modern volcanology with the definition and the analysis of the deadliest volcanic hazard: pyroclastic flows and surges, also known as nuées ardentes (Fr: burning clouds). Eruptions of a similar type are now known as "Peléan eruptions". Among those who studied Mount Pelée were Antoine Lacroix and Angelo Heilprin. Lacroix was the first to describe the nuée ardente (pyroclastic flow) phenomenon.

The destruction caused by the 1902 eruption was quickly publicized by recent modern means of communication. It brought to the attention of the public and governments the hazards and dangers of an active volcano.

See also

List of large volcanic eruptions of the 20th century
List of volcanic eruptions by death toll
1951 eruption of Mount Lamington

References

20th-century volcanic events
VEI-4 eruptions
Phreatic eruptions
Peléan eruptions
Natural disasters in Martinique
1902 natural disasters
1902 in the Caribbean
Volcanic tsunamis

ast:Monte Pelée#Erupción de 1902
ca:Mont Pelée#Erupció de 1902
cs:Mont Pelée#Erupce v roce 1902
de:Montagne Pelée#Der große Ausbruch
el:Όρος Πελέ#Έκρηξη του 1902
it:La Pelée#Eruzione del 1902
he:פלה (הר)#ההתפרצות של 1902
lv:Pelē#Izvirdums
lb:Montagne Pelée#Ausbroch vun 1902
lt:Pelė ugnikalnis#1902 m. išsiveržimas
ms:Gunung Pelée#Letusan pada 1902
ja:プレー山#1902年の噴火
no:Montagne Pelée#Katastrofeutbruddet i 1902
pt:Monte Pelée#A erupção de 1902
ro:Muntele Pelée#Erupția din 1902
ru:Монтань-Пеле#Извержение 1902 года
sk:Pelée (stratovulkán)#Katastrofa v roku 1902
th:ภูเขาไฟเปอเล#การปะทุเมื่อ พ.ศ. 2445
zh:培雷火山#爆發